The Tajikistan women's national cricket team is the team that represents the country of Tajikistan in international women's cricket matches. They made their international debut when they hosted Afghanistan in July 2012 in Shahrinav District in a three match series which they won one and lost two.

Head coaches

 Asadullah Khan 2012-

References

Cricket
Tajikistan in international cricket
Women's national cricket teams
Cricket in Tajikistan